USLHT Armeria was a lighthouse tender in commission with the United States Lighthouse Board from December 1890 to March 1898. After Spanish–American War service in the United States Navy as USS Armeria from May to August 1898, she resumed her lighthouse tender duties, first with the Lighthouse Board from 1898 to 1910 and then with its successor organization, the United States Lighthouse Service, from 1910 until she was wrecked in 1912. She was the first lighthouse tender assigned to permanent duty in the Territory of Alaska.

Construction and commissioning
Armeria was constructed by Dialogue & Company in Camden, New Jersey, for the United States Lighthouse Board. Intended for lighthouse tender service along the United States East Coast and United States Gulf Coast, she was commissioned into service in the Lighthouse Board's fleet as USLHT Armeria on 4 December 1890.

Service history

1890–1898
Upon commissioning, Armeria was assigned to the 3rd Lighthouse District, with her home port at New York City.

Spanish–American War
As U.S. relations with Spain deteriorated in 1898, Armeria was transferred to the United States Navy on 24 March 1898 for anticipated war service. She was converted for naval service – including the installation of two guns – at the Norfolk Navy Yard in Portsmouth, Virginia. The Spanish–American War broke out in April 1898, and on 5 May 1898 Armeria was commissioned into U.S. Navy service under the command of Lieutenant Commander Leavitt Curtis Logan. She was assigned to the North Atlantic Squadron.

In early June 1898, Armeria was operating off the north coast of Cuba with the armed yacht  and the steamer  when the gunboat  misidentified them as a Spanish Navy squadron; the mistaken report delayed the departure from the United States of the United States Army's Fifth Army Corps for landings on Cuba by six days while U.S. Navy forces verified the actual location of Spanish Navy warships. As the war continued, Armeria made two voyages from the United States to Cuba carrying ammunition for U.S. Army forces fighting Spanish forces there. She arrived at Key West, Florida, on 9 August 1898 and the Navy transferred her back to the Lighthouse Board on 11 August 1898, two days before the war ended.

Later service
After her return to the Lighthouse Board, Armeria resumed her duties in the 3rd Lighthouse District. In 1907, she was reassigned to the 13th Lighthouse District in the Pacific Northwest. The U.S. Lighthouse Board was abolished in 1910 and replaced by the new United States Lighthouse Service, and she became part of the Lighthouse Service fleet. She was transferred to the 16th Lighthouse District at Ketchikan in Southeast Alaska in 1911, becoming the first lighthouse tender to be permanently assigned to operations in the Territory of Alaska.

Loss
Armeria was wrecked in May 1912 under circumstances related to the wreck that month of the barge Haydn Brown. Sources agree that the tug Pioneer cut Haydn Brown loose in the Gulf of Alaska during a storm and that Haydn Brown drifted for two days with Pioneer in pursuit before being wrecked on rocks at the southern tip of Montague Island on the coast of Southcentral Alaska with the loss of seven of the eight people on board. They also agree that Armeria arrived on the scene and rescued Haydn Brown′s lone survivor but was herself wrecked soon thereafter.

Otherwise, sources differ on the details of the wreck of Armeria. According to one source, Pioneer cut Haydn Brown loose on 10 May 1912, and Haydn Brown came ashore on Montague Island on 12 May; Armeria picked up the lone survivor from the beach on 15 May, but then herself was wrecked that day on an uncharted submerged rock off Montague Island while maneuvering after the rescue. According to this version of events, the steamer Admiral Sampson responded to Armeria′s distress signal and rescued Armeria′s entire crew of 36 plus the Haydn Brown survivor she had taken aboard. In a different account of events, other sources claim that Pioneer cut Haydn Brown loose on 16 May, that Haydn Brown was wrecked on Montague Island on 18 May, and that Armeria successfully rescued Haydn Brown′s lone survivor; Armeria then proceeded to  Cape Hinchinbrook Light near the south end of Hinchinbrook Island off Southcentral Alaska to deliver coal and supplies and was herself wrecked when she struck an uncharted submerged rock off Hinchinbrook Island on 20 May 1912. In this version of events, the lighthouse crew assisted the crew of Armeria and Haydn Brown′s lone survivor in getting ashore on Hinchinbrook Island, and Admiral Sampson picked them up there.

Regardless of the date and location of Armeria′s demise, some of her $70,000 cargo of coal, buoys, and supplies was salvaged. However, Armeria herself – valued at $344,000 – was deemed a total loss, and her wreck was sold at auction.

Commemoration

In accordance with a proposal by the United States Hydrographic Office, Armeria Point on the northwest coast of Agattu Island in the Aleutian Islands was named for Armeria in 1938.

References
 

Ships of the United States Lighthouse Service
Lighthouse tenders of the United States
Spanish–American War ships of the United States
Auxiliary ships of the United States Navy
1890 ships
Ships built by Dialogue & Company
Maritime incidents in 1912
Shipwrecks of the Alaska coast